The Caves of Mars Project was an early 2000s program funded through Phase II by the NASA Institute for Advanced Concepts
to assess the best place to situate the research and habitation modules that a human mission to Mars would require. The final report was published in mid 2004.

Description 

Caves and other underground structures, including Martian lava tubes, canyon overhangs, and other Martian cavities would be potentially useful for crewed missions, for they would provide considerable shielding from both the elements and intense solar radiation to which a Mars mission would expose astronauts.  They might also offer access to minerals, gases, ices, and any subterranean life that the crew of such a mission would probably be searching for.

The program also studied designs for inflatable modules and other such structures that would aid the astronauts to build a livable environment for humans and earth creatures.

Summary of final report 
The final report, Human Utilization Of Subsurface Extraterrestrial Environments, is divided into 10 parts:
 Project Summary
 Introduction
 Enabling Technologies Identification
 Essential Tasks Identification
 Demonstration Missions
 Technology Trials
 Planetary Protection Protocol Development
 Education and Outreach
 Conclusions
 References Cited and Further Reading
Section 1, the Project summary summarizes the entire project and claims that "This project developed a revolutionary system to exploit the novel idea of extraterrestrial cave use" and explaining that two experiments or "Missions" were tested to gather data.

Section 2, the Introduction answers the question of "why caves [for martian research bases]?" and provides a variety of different answers to the advantages of using caves as a foothold in Martian exploration such as:
 It is surmised that atmosphere temperature variations are less experienced in caves than on the surface of Mars.
 Caves protect lifeforms and equipment from harmful solar and galactic radiation.
 Caves protect from dust storms and micrometeorite impacts.
 Exploring caves is a key scientific interest as it makes it easy to study the geology, history, and possible presence of life on Mars without heavy excavation equipment.
 The ability of pressurizing caves to make them more habitable to human lifeforms.
 Allows the easy extraction of subsurface materials such as ice and minerals.
This section also contains some speculation on the existence and locations of such caves and what types of caves exist on Mars however it is largely outdated by newer research such as the HiRISE and THEMIS missions.

Section 3, a description of the Enabling Technologies analyses a number of Innovations necessary for the utilization and assigns them a Technology Readiness Level. For example, the innovation "Foamed-in-place Airlocks" are assigned a TRL of 5, while the "Inert Pressurization of Caves" is assigned a TRL of 2.

Section 4 describes the "Essential Tasks" necessary for cave habitation. These are:
 Finding extraterrestrial caves
 Protecting the scientific environment inside of a cave 
 Dealing with the dark (providing lighting solutions for the interior of the habitats)
 Cave Life support
The publication discusses each of these topics in detail and highlights the novel idea of using luminescent bacteria as a lighting backup solution and suggests lighting the habitat using "light piping" technology. The article also discusses skylights and radiation proof glass at length however this is probably due to the lack of advanced solar panels and LED lighting technology available during the publication in 2000.

Section 5 contains information on the "Demonstration Missions", specifically the "Mouse Mission to Inner Space" (MOMIS) and the Human equivalent, "HUMIS". The idea was to develop preliminary versions of some aspects of a Mars cave habitat such as using argon breathing mixtures and other new life support systems on mouse test subjects. The MOMIS experiment has successfully completed multiple runs however the HUMIS experiment was deemed out of the scope of the investigation and although efforts were made to find test sites, the work done was reflected in a "Cave Astrobiology" exploration-level class at Penn State College during the spring semester of 2004.

Section 6 covers the different "Technology Trials" performed. First, Inflatable habitats were investigated to provide a "shirtsleeve indoor environment" for the astronauts. The article further suggests that if the cave's cross sectional surface area is properly sized, an inflatable cave liner could be placed in the cave and inflated requiring no additional support systems. The article then suggests using a dual-liner system in which an outer liner provides a surface against the cave surface and a pressure seal and an inner liner provides a habitat for the astronauts. Machinery and life support systems could be placed in between the redundant liners. The report also outlines methods of folding, manufacturing, transporting, replacing, and inflating these liners. Another main topic of this section is the "foamed in place" airlocks. These are designed to be shape-conforming to highly irregular openings along with easy to deploy and leak tight. Their final proposed system is an airlock unit with multiple extending telescoping legs to all of the cave walls. The space between the airlocks and the cave walls are then filled with hardening, spray-able, airtight foam. Next, the report outlines methods by which an inert pressure atmosphere could be created by pressurizing the gasses present on Mars, particularly Argon. This would allow human scientists only to wear breathing apparatuses and not require full pressure suits. It is suggested that cavernous spaces not be filled with oxygen or other reactive gasses as this would nullify any potential scientific value of the cave along with potentially being harmful to the humans breathing in the atmosphere inside. Finally, this section covers a system that would allow communication networks inside caves. This was also tested in a real cave (Robertson's Cave) and future modifications are suggested for increasing bandwidth and signal strength.

Section 7 covers the development of a Planetary Protection Protocol and highlights its importance when exploring martian caves and suggests using "sterilized micro-robots" to perform exploration and science.

Section 8 is named "Education and Outreach". It contains information on the spinoff science-fair experiments generated from this report and the other outreach impacts that this report and creating it had. This section also outlines educational activities for schools such as a "Find the lava tube activity" and "The  Mousetronauts Program".

Sections 9 and 10 conclude the report and cite references for further reading.

Results 

The project showed crickets and mice could breathe argon mixtures for extended periods without apparent problems.

The project produced many educational materials, made available through its outreach initiative.

Demonstrated wireless communications within limestone cave system.

See also

Exploration of Mars
Colonization of Mars
Martian lava tube

References

External links
 The Caves of Mars Project 
Human utilization of subsurface extraterrestrial environments (2002 NIAC Paper on living underground on Mars)

News
 
 Herbert W. Franke, "Höhlen auf dem Mars", Naturwissenschaftliche Rundschau 1998, Issue 5, page 169-175
 "Life in the Extremes: An Interview With Dr. Penelope Boston", 2000
 Radio interview on the caves with NASA scientists by Planetary Society.

NASA programs
Human missions to Mars